Argentino Channel, also known as Ferguson Channel, is a channel between Bryde Island and the west coast of Graham Land, connecting Paradise Harbor with Gerlache Strait. It was first roughly charted by the Belgian Antarctic Expedition, 1897–99; the name "Canal Argentino" appears on an Argentine government chart of 1950.

See also
Gerlache Strait Geology

References
 

Channels of the Southern Ocean
Straits of Graham Land
Straits of the Palmer Archipelago
Danco Coast